Radiant may refer to:

Computers, software, and video games
 Radiant (software), a content management system
 GtkRadiant, a level editor created by id Software for their games
 Radiant AI, a technology developed by Bethesda Softworks for The Elder Scrolls games
 Radiant, the team that opposes Dire on Dota 2

Music
 Radiant (Atlantic Starr album), 1981
 Radiant (Iris album), 2014

Ships
 HMS Radiant (1916), a destroyer of the British Royal Navy launched in 1916 and sold in 1920
 USS Radiant, the name of more than one United States Navy ship
 Radiant (yacht), a 2009 Lürssen built yacht

Others
 Radiant heat, or thermal radiation, electromagnetic radiation emitted from the surface of an object which is due to the object's temperature
 Radiant heating, a technology for heating indoor and outdoor areas
 Radiant (Kitchen manufacturer), an Australian manufacturer of products for kitchens and laundries
 Radiant (Magic: The Gathering), an archangel in the Magic: The Gathering trading card game
 Radiant (meteor shower), the apparent origin point of meteors in a meteor shower
 Radiant (novel), a 2004 science fiction novel by James Alan Gardner
 Radiant (manfra), a French manfra series by Tony Valente
 Radiant (typeface), a sans-serif typeface
 Radiant, a diamond cut
 Radiant, a line of feminine hygiene products by Procter & Gamble
 Radiant Towers, a private housing estate in Tseung Kwan O, Hong Kong

See also
 Radiance (disambiguation)
 Radian (disambiguation)
 Ray (optics)
 Radio, the combining form of radiant